Ditha Sab is a comedy serial on Kantipur Television mainly focused on entertaining the audiences with light rural humor with high demand on YouTube as well.

Cast of Ditha Sab 
 Kishor Bhandari
 Reshma Timilsina
 Raju Comedy

Crew of Ditha Sab 
 Writer / Director : 'Kishor Bhandari'

References

External links 
 Kantipur Television

Nepalese television series
2010s Nepalese television series